Kenneth William Kavanaugh (November 23, 1916 – January 25, 2007) was an American football player, coach, and scout. He played professionally in the National Football League (NFL) for the Chicago Bears as an end from 1940 to 1950, except for three seasons during which he served in World War II. He led the league in receiving touchdowns twice, and is a member of the NFL 1940s All-Decade Team. He is the Bears' all-time leader in receiving touchdowns, with 50. He retired with the second most receiving touchdowns in NFL history and was the second to reach 50 touchdowns in NFL history.

Kavanaugh played college football at Louisiana State University for the LSU Tigers, where he was named most valuable player of the Southeastern Conference and a consensus All-American in 1939 after leading the nation in receptions and receiving yards. He was elected to the College Football Hall of Fame in 1963.

Early life and college
Kavanaugh was born in Little Rock, Arkansas. He graduated from Little Rock Central High School in 1936.

Kavanaugh arrived at Louisiana State University in Baton Rouge, Louisiana in 1936 and joined the LSU football varsity team in 1937. As an end, he was quickly able to fill the void in the offense left by the departure of two-time All-American Gaynell Tinsley. At , Kavanaugh was a large receiver for his time, and used his size to outreach defenders. Bernie Moore, Kavanaugh's head coach at LSU, said Kavanaugh "was a pass completer rather than a receiver, simply because he'd catch passes no one else could get to." He was named to the Associated Press (AP) All-Southeastern Conference (SEC) second alternate team after the 1937 season. In 1938, the AP named him a first-team All-SEC selection, and he was a second-team selection by the United Press.

In 1939, in a game against Holy Cross, Kavanaugh caught four touchdown passes in the 26–7 win. According to Kavanaugh and teammate Young Bussey, Kavanaugh found four rusty nails on the sideline during the game. The next week against Rice, he found another nail and scored another touchdown to give LSU a 7–0 win. The pattern continued against Loyola and Vanderbilt, as Kavanaugh found two nails before each game and in each scored two touchdowns. A sportswriter for the Baton Rouge Advocate claimed he saw coach Bernie Moore at a local store stocking up on nails before LSU's game against No. 1 Tennessee. Kavanaugh failed to score in the game, however, as the Tigers lost 20–0.

The Nashville Banner named Kavanaugh co-MVP of the Southeastern Conference for 1939 along with Bob Foxx of Tennessee. Kavanaugh was a consensus All-America selection for the 1939 All-America Team, being named to the team by five of the nine official selectors. He was also awarded the Knute Rockne Memorial Trophy by the Washington D.C. Touchdown Club as the nation's lineman of the year, and finished seventh in Heisman Trophy balloting.

Professional

Pre-war
After college, Kavanaugh signed a minor league baseball contract with the St. Louis Cardinals organization for $300 a month. He later signed with the NFL's Chicago Bears after striking a deal with Bears owner George Halas for $300 a game. He played for the Bears during a period in which they were nicknamed the Monsters of the Midway. In the 1940 NFL Championship Game, the Bears defeated the Washington Redskins 73–0, the most lopsided victory in NFL history. Kavanaugh caught the game's only touchdown pass, a 30-yard reception from quarterback Sid Luckman shortly before halftime. The next season, the Bears won the 1941 NFL Championship Game, as they defeated the New York Giants 39–7 and repeated as NFL champions. The final score in the game was a fumble recovery by Kavanaugh on defense, returning the ball 42 yards for a touchdown. In his first two seasons with the Bears, Kavanaugh compiled 23 receptions for 590 yards and nine touchdowns.

World War II
Kavanaugh's career was interrupted by World War II, in which he was a pilot in the European theater. He was a member of the Eighth Air Force's 490th Bombardment Group and 851st Bombardment Squadron, and attained the rank of captain. He flew 30 missions and was awarded the Distinguished Flying Cross and the Air Medal with four oak leaf clusters. Former LSU and Bears teammate Young Bussey was the Bears' only casualty in the war.

Post-war
After the war, he continued his career with the Bears. In 1945 he had 543 yards and six touchdowns, and in 1946 had 337 yards and five touchdowns. Three of his touchdowns in 1946 came in a 27–21 win over the Los Angeles Rams in week seven. The Bears defeated the New York Giants 24–14 in the 1946 NFL Championship Game, which gave Kavanaugh his third league championship with the team. The first touchdown of the game was a 21-yard pass from Luckman to Kavanaugh. After the season, he was named to the United Press All-NFL first-team. Kavanaugh had his most productive season statistically in 1947. He had career highs with 32 receptions, 881 yards, and 13 touchdowns. He set a Bears record by recording a receiving touchdown in seven straight games, a streak that began with a three-touchdown game against the Boston Yanks in week six. His 13 receiving touchdowns led the league, and he earned his second straight first-team All-NFL selection from the United Press.

Kavanaugh was named to his third straight All-NFL first-team in 1948, and he again led the league in receiving touchdowns in 1949, with nine. His most productive single-game yardage performance came in his final season, in 1950 against the Yanks, as he caught eight passes for 177 yards and a touchdown.

Kavanaugh spent a total of eight seasons in Chicago. He spent the majority of his career catching passes from quarterbacks Sid Luckman and Johnny Lujack. He remains the Bears' career leader in  touchdown receptions, with 50. He also holds franchise records for highest career and single season yards-per-reception. His 13 touchdown receptions in 1947 is a single season Bears record he shares with Dick Gordon, who tied it in 1970.

In 1969, Kavanaugh was voted by sportswriters to the NFL 1940s All-Decade Team. The Professional Football Researchers Association named Kavanaugh to the PRFA Hall of Very Good Class of 2009

Coaching career and later life
After he retired from playing, he remained with the Bears for the 1951 season as an ends coach. He was hired by Boston College in 1952 to serve in the same position, until his resignation in 1954. After serving as an assistant at Villanova in 1954, Kavanaugh was hired by the New York Giants in 1955 as ends coach and continued in that position until 1970. He became a scout for the Giants in 1971, serving until his retirement from football in 1999.

His son, Ken Kavanaugh Jr. played at LSU as a tight end. He was drafted by the Giants in the 1972 NFL Draft but did not play professionally.

Kavanaugh died of complications from pneumonia on January 25, 2007, in Sarasota, Florida.

See also
 List of National Football League annual receiving touchdowns leaders
 List of NCAA major college football yearly receiving leaders

References

Bibliography

External links
 

1916 births
2007 deaths
American football ends
Chicago Bears players
LSU Tigers football players
Boston College Eagles football coaches
Villanova Wildcats football coaches
New York Giants coaches
New York Giants scouts
All-American college football players
College Football Hall of Fame inductees
United States Army Air Forces pilots of World War II
United States Army Air Forces officers
Recipients of the Air Medal
Recipients of the Distinguished Flying Cross (United States)
Sportspeople from Little Rock, Arkansas
Players of American football from Arkansas
Deaths from pneumonia in Florida